Mi La Le Mémoire Est Chasse La Mille Voix Têtes De Tête Dans De Sa Ris Neige: Le Monstre Absent is an EP by Et Sans. It was released in 2004 by Squint Fucker Press.

The album is recorded onto a Mini CD, which came in a plastic bag that was taped together. Like their debut album, this EP is one song that is 20 minutes and 5 seconds long. The track takes its name from the EP title.

Track listing

 "Mi La Le Mémoire Est Chasse La Mille Voix Têtes De Tête Dans De Sa Ris Neige: Le Monstre Absent" – 20:05

Personnel

Et Sans

 Roger Tellier-Craig
 Alexandre St-Onge

Notes

Et Sans albums
2004 EPs